Sukhvor-e Kohzad (also Romanized as Sūkhvor-e Kohzād and Sūkhūr-e Kohzād; also known as Sūkhvor Gahzād) is a village in Heydariyeh Rural District, Govar District, Gilan-e Gharb County, Kermanshah Province, Iran. At the 2006 census, its population was 355, in 80 families.

References 

Populated places in Gilan-e Gharb County